Abu Muhsin al-Masri (born Husam Abd-al-Ra'uf) was an Egyptian militant and a high-ranking member of al-Qaeda.

Background
He was added to FBI’s Most Wanted Terrorists List in 2019. He was killed in an operation by the National Directorate of Security (NDS) in Central Ghazni Province, Afghanistan. Director of US National Counter-Terrorism Center, Chris Miller, confirmed the death of Al Masri. However, the Federal Bureau of Investigation (FBI) declined to issue any statement in relation to the death of Al Masri.

References

1958 births
2020 deaths
Assassinated al-Qaeda leaders
Egyptian al-Qaeda members
FBI Most Wanted Terrorists
Fugitives wanted on terrorism charges
Fugitives wanted by the United States
Individuals designated as terrorists by the United States government